Deutscher Landwein can refer to:
 German wine classification above Tafelwein
 Fruit wine from Germany